The Irish Journal of Medical Science is a quarterly peer-reviewed medical journal that was established in 1832 by Robert Kane as the Dublin Journal of Medical & Chemical Science. Besides Kane, it had distinguished editors like Robert James Graves and William Wilde. It is the official organ of the Royal Academy of Medicine in Ireland and published by Springer Science+Business Media.

History 

The journal was established in 1832 as the Dublin Journal of Medical & Chemical Science. It was then sequentially titled: 
Dublin Journal of Medical Science (until 1845) 
Dublin Quarterly Journal of Medical Science (from 1846 to 1871) 
Dublin Journal of Medical Science (until 1925)
In 1925 it obtained its current title and volume numbering was restarted at 1.

William Wilde became editor in 1845. Contributors included Dublin physicians Abraham Colles (1773–1840), William Stokes (1763–1845), Sir Philip Crampton (1777–1858), Thomas Ledwich (1823–1858), Arthur Jacob (1790–1874), Robert Adams (1791–1875), Stephen Myles MacSwiney (died 1890), Sir Charles Cameron (1830–1921) and Ephraim MacDowel Cosgrave (1847–1925).

James Little (1837–1916) was editor from 1869 to 1875; during his tenure, the journal changed from a quarterly to a monthly publication.

Abstracting and indexing 
The journal is abstracted and indexed in Academic OneFile, Chemical Abstracts Service, CSA, Current Contents/Clinical Medicine, EMBASE, Health Reference Center Academic, IBIDS, INIS Atomindex, PubMed/MEDLINE, Science Citation Index Expanded, Scopus, and Summon by Serial Solutions. According to the Journal Citation Reports, the journal has a 2016 impact factor of 1.224.

See also
 Dublin Medical Press

References

External links 
 
 Index of the Dublin Journal of Medical Science 1832–1949. A UCD Digital Library Collection.
 

Quarterly journals
Publications established in 1832
General medical journals
English-language journals
Springer Science+Business Media academic journals
1832 establishments in Ireland